Ervin Feldheim (Kassa, September 21, 1912 – Bor, 1944) was a Hungarian mathematician working on analysis, particularly, approximation theory. He was killed by the Nazis in 1944.

Selected publications

References

20th-century Hungarian mathematicians
Approximation theorists
1912 births
1944 deaths
Austro-Hungarian mathematicians
Hungarian people who died in the Holocaust
Dachau concentration camp survivors